Yūki Obata (小畑友紀, おばた ゆうき, Obata Yuuki) (born January 9, 1962) is a Japanese manga artist born in Hokkaido, Japan. She is mainly known for her work We Were There (僕等がいた, Bokura ga Ita).

Career 
In 1998, Obata made her debut with Rain Drops published in the Shogakukan's magazine Deluxe Separate Volume Shojo Comic. Since her debut, Obata's works are primarily published in Shogakukan's Betsucomi.

In 2002, We Were There began serialization in Bestucomi, eventually becoming her most popular work with over 10 million volumes in circulation. An anime adaption of the work was released in 2006, followed by a live-action film in 2012.

From July 31 to September 5, 2010, an exhibition of Obata's original art was held on the second floor of JR Kushiro Station in Hokkaido. Exhibitions of Obata's original artwork from We Were There were also held in Sapporo and Tokyo from March to April 2012.

Works 

 Rain Drops (1998) – one-shot in Shogakukan's Bessatsu Shōjo Comic
 Kimi no Kachi (きみの勝ち) (2000) – one-shot in Bessatsu Shōjo Comic
 Suki, Kirai, Suki (スキキライ好き) (2000) – serialized in Bessatsu Shōjo Comic, 1 volume published
 Maru Sankaku Shikaku (まる三角しかく) (2000-2001) – 2 volumes published
 Sumire wa Blue (スミレはブルー) (2001-2002) – serialized in Bessatsu Shōjo Comic, then Betsucomi, 2 volumes published
 We Were There (僕等がいた, Bokura ga Ita) (2002-2012) – serialized in Betsucomi, 16 volumes published
 Haru Meguru (春巡る) (2012-2014 hiatus) – serialized in Shueisha's Cookie, 2 volumes published

Awards 
In 1998, Obata won a Shogakukan Award Honorable Mention in the New Mangaka category for the one-shot Rain Drops. In 2004, We Were There won the 50th Shogakukan Manga Award in the shoujo category, tied with Sand Chronicles by Hinako Ashihara.

References

External links 

 Yūki Obata at Anime News Network's encyclopedia

Yuki Obata
Manga artists
People from Hokkaido
Living people
1962 births